Heidelberg is a town with 35,500 inhabitants in the Gauteng province of South Africa at the foot of the Suikerbosrand next to the N3 highway, which connects Johannesburg and Durban.

History 
It used to be the kraal of the bakwena until colonization and the basotho wars. Heidelberg Began in 1862 as a trading station built by a German, Heinrich Julius Ueckermann. A town was laid out around the store and named after Ueckermann's alma mater. In 1866, the District of Heidelberg was created from the eastern portion of the Potchefstroom district with its own landdroost (magistrate) having been laid out as a churchplace in 1865.

Heidelberg is some 50 kilometres south-east of Johannesburg, close to the Mpumalanga border. Just south of the town is the De Hoek toll plaza on the newest section of the N3, which opened in December 2001.

Heidelberg sits nestled at the eastern end of the Suikerbosrand Nature Reserve, a large tract of land that is home to Gauteng's highest point, almost 2,000 metres above sea level.

Heidelberg has played an important part in South African history acting as a capital for the Boer republic during the war with Great Britain. During the First War of Independence, Heidelberg served as capital of the Zuid Afrikaansche Republiek under the Triumvirate of Paul Kruger, P.J. Joubert and M.W. Pretorius, from 1880 to 1883.

In 1885 the Witwatersrand gold reef was discovered in the Heidelberg district and the office of the Mining Commissioner was established there. 

Heidelberg developed as a typical rural Victorian town. Many buildings dating back to the period between 1890 and 1910 have been preserved.

In addition, Heidelberg was home to A.G. Visser, a well-loved medical doctor and famous Afrikaans poet. His home (only open to the public by appointment) can still be seen situated close to the main road through town. Historical landmarks in the town includes A.G. Visser's bust and the Klipkerk. 

The British built a concentration camp here during the Second Boer War to house Boer women and children. A monument was erected in the main cemetery to the memory of the women and children. A monument was erected by the current ANC-led municipality in the late 1990s. It commemorates the black women and children who also died during the war.

Other famous people that lived in Heidelberg is the RAF World War II ace Johannes Jacobus le Roux, opera singer Emma Renzi, Protea bowler Fanie de Villiers, religious leader Justice Tsungu, actors George Ballot, Zach du Plessis, Magda van Biljon and Rhyno Hatting, springbok rugby player Ockie Oosthuizen, writer PG du Plessis and mountain biker Melt Swanepoel.

The "Jo'burg to Sea" mountain bike stage race starts in Heidelberg.  There is every year a "Varkfees" festival with singers from all around South Africa performing at this festival.  The "Outdoor X" show is held just outside Heidelberg on the Malonjeni Guest Farm.

The far right secessionist political organisation (and former paramilitary group) the Afrikaner Weerstandsbeweging (AWB) was founded by the late white supremacist and white separatist leader Eugène Terre'Blanche in Rensburg (a suburb of Heidelberg). Its headquarters are now in Terre'Blanche's hometown of Ventersdorp.

Birthplace of Olympic Silver Medalist  
2008 Olympic Silver Medalist in the Long Jump, Godfrey Mokoena, was born in Heidelberg in 1985.

Notable people
 

Prince Hlela (born 1984), South African footballer

References

External links 

 Google Map
 

Second Boer War concentration camps
Populated places in the Lesedi Local Municipality
Populated places established in 1886